Chesterfield was a municipal borough in Derbyshire, England from 1835 to 1974. It was formed under the Municipal Corporations Act 1835 from the Ancient borough of Chesterfield.

In 1974 under the Local Government Act 1972 the borough was abolished and combined with the Staveley Urban District and the Brimington civil parish of Chesterfield Rural District to form the new Chesterfield borough.

References

Districts of England abolished by the Local Government Act 1972
History of Derbyshire
Municipal boroughs of England
Municipal Borough of